The 2010 UK Open Qualifiers were a series of eight dart tournaments organised by the Professional Darts Corporation. Along with 37 Players Championship events, they comprised the 2010 PDC Pro Tour. The tournaments qualified 96 players to the 2010 UK Open.

Prize money 
Each of the eight qualifiers had a prize fund of £31,200 with a £6,000 winner's share, matching the UK Pro Tour events. Cumulative earnings formed the UK Open Order of Merit.

Order of Merit
The UK Open Order of Merit was formed by adding the earnings of all players that played more than three of the qualifying events.

Amateur and BDO qualifying players
32 amateur players also qualified from Rileys qualifiers held in Rileys Dart Zones across Britain.

A final 10 players qualified as BDO representatives from Avon, Bedfordshire, East Stirlingshire, Gloucestershire, Hampshire, Lothian, Northumberland, Nottinghamshire, Surrey, Warwickshire.

Qualifier 1

The 2010 UK Open Qualifier 1 was the first of eight 2010 UK Open Darts Qualifiers which was held at the Oasis Leisure Centre in Swindon on Sunday 21 February.

Qualifier 2

The 2010 UK Open Qualifier 2 was the second of eight 2010 UK Open Darts Qualifiers which was held at the Moorways Centre in Derby on Sunday 28 February.

Qualifier 3

The 2010 UK Open Qualifier 3 was the third of eight 2010 UK Open Darts Qualifiers which was held at the Robin Park Tennis Centre in Wigan on Sunday 14 March.

Qualifier 4

The 2010 UK Open Qualifier 4 was the fourth of eight 2010 UK Open Darts Qualifiers which was held at the K2 Centre in Crawley on Sunday 21 March.

Qualifier 5

The 2010 UK Open Qualifier 5 was the fifth of eight 2010 UK Open Darts Qualifiers which was held at the Barnsley Metrodome on Sunday 11 April.

Qualifier 6

The 2010 UK Open Qualifier 6 was the sixth of eight 2010 UK Open Darts Qualifiers which was held at the Moorways Centre in Derby on Sunday 18 April.

Qualifier 7

The 2010 UK Open Qualifier 7 was the seventh of eight 2010 UK Open Darts Qualifiers which was held at the Robin Park Tennis Centre in Wigan on Sunday 25 April.

Qualifier 8

The 2010 UK Open Qualifier 8 was the last of eight 2010 UK Open Darts Qualifiers which was held at the Robin Park Tennis Centre in Wigan on Sunday 9 May.

References

PDC Pro Tour
2010 in darts
UK Open